Yankton is a city in and the county seat of Yankton County, South Dakota, United States.

The population was 15,411 at the 2020 census, and it is the principal city of the Yankton Micropolitan Statistical Area, which includes the entirety of Yankton County and which had an estimated population of 23,297 as of July 1, 2021. As the first capital of Dakota Territory, it was named after the Yankton tribe of Western Dakota people; Yankton is derived from the Dakota word I-hank-ton-wan ("the end village").

Yankton is located on the Missouri River just downstream of the Gavins Point Dam and Lewis and Clark Lake, and just upstream of the confluence with the James River. The United States National Park Service's headquarters for the Missouri National Recreational River are located in the city. The Human Services Center was established as a psychiatric hospital in 1882 and is on the National Register of Historic Places.

Yankton is commonly referred to as the "River City", due to its proximity to the Missouri River and the importance the river played in the city's settlement and development.  Yankton has also earned the nickname "Mother City of the Dakotas", due to the early important role it played in the creation and development of the Dakota Territory, which later became the 39th and 40th U.S. states of North and South Dakota.

Owing to the early exploitation of Fort Hays Limestone for cement manufacture, including shipment of cement to the construction of the Panama Canal, Yankton once also had the nickname "Cement City".

Geography

Yankton is located at  (42.881647, −97.392485). in southern South Dakota on the state's border with Nebraska. The city is located on one of the last free-flowing, natural stretches of the Missouri River; this segment of the river, between Gavins Point Dam four miles west of Yankton, and Ponca State Park in Nebraska, has been designated by the U.S. National Park Service as the Missouri National Recreational River.

The city is located approximately six miles west of the point where the James River flows into the Missouri.

The central business district of the city is located on a natural landing along the Missouri River, and city rises in the west to "Mount Marty" (actually a high bluff along the river).  The city is also intersected by the Marne Creek, which also flows into the Missouri River. Lewis and Clark Lake is located four miles west of the city.

Yankton has been assigned the ZIP codes 57078-57079 and the FIPS place code 73060.

Climate
Yankton has a humid continental climate (Koppen Dfa), with cold winters and hot summers.

Demographics

2010 census
As of the census of 2010, there were 14,454 people, 5,909 households, and 3,348 families residing in the city. The racial makeup of the city was 92.1% White, 2.1% African American, 2.3% Native American, 0.7% Asian, 1.3% from other races, and 1.6% from two or more races. Hispanic or Latino of any race were 3.4% of the population.

There were 5,909 households, of which 27.3% had children under the age of 18 living with them, 43.1% were married couples living together, 10.1% had a female householder with no husband present, 3.5% had a male householder with no wife present, and 43.3% were non-families. 37.5% of all households were made up of individuals, and 15.2% had someone living alone who was 65 years of age or older. The average household size was 2.17 and the average family size was 2.87.

The median age in the city was 40.4 years. 20.9% of residents were under the age of 18; 9% were between the ages of 18 and 24; 26% were from 25 to 44; 26.1% were from 45 to 64; and 17.9% were 65 years of age or older. The gender makeup of the city was 50.5% male and 49.5% female.

2000 census
As of the census of 2000, there were 13,528 people, 5,369 households, and 3,232 families residing in the city. The population density was 1,743.2 people per square mile (673.1/km2). There were 5,735 housing units at an average density of 739.0 per square mile (285.3/km2). The racial makeup of the city was 94.35% White, 1.64% African American, 1.58% Native American, 0.50% Asian, 0.03% Pacific Islander, 0.90% from other races, and 0.99% from two or more races. Hispanic or Latino of any race were 2.46% of the population.

There were 5,369 households, out of which 29.5% had children under the age of 18 living with them, 47.5% were married couples living together, 9.8% had a female householder with no husband present, and 39.8% were non-families. 34.9% of all households were made up of individuals, and 15.0% had someone living alone who was 65 years of age or older. The average household size was 2.27 and the average family size was 2.96.

In the city, the population was spread out, with 23.4% under the age of 18, 9.8% from 18 to 24, 28.2% from 25 to 44, 21.4% from 45 to 64, and 17.2% who were 65 years of age or older. The median age was 38 years. For every 100 females, there were 96.1 males. For every 100 females age 18 and over, there were 95.0 males.

As of 2000 the median income for a household in the city was $31,843, and the median income for a family was $44,009. Men had a median income of $29,012 versus $20,577 for women. The per capita income for the city was $17,954. About 6.2% of families and 10.2% of the population were below the poverty line, including 10.8% of those under age 18 and 9.1% of those age 65 or over.

According to the 2003 Coldwell Banker Housing Price Comparison Index (HPCI), Yankton was found to have the lowest housing costs of any municipal entity in the entire United States.  This is no longer the case as of the 2005 HPCI.

History

Native inhabitants
The site of Yankton was occupied by the Yankton Sioux (Dakota) prior to the arrival of European settlers.  As part of the vast Louisiana Purchase, the site of Yankton was visited by Lewis and Clark in 1804. In the journals of the expedition, the explorers write of a meeting on August 30, 1804, with members of the Yankton Sioux Tribe on a Missouri River bluff presently known as Calumet Bluff. As recently as 1857, the present day site of Yankton was occupied by a village of Yankton Sioux led by Chief Pa-le-ne-a-pa-pe ("Struck by the Ree"). Two years later, with the signing of the Yankton Treaty of 1858, the land was opened for settlement. The city was founded where the small Rhine Creek (renamed Marne Creek in World War I) flowed into the Missouri River. The city grew as a stop for steamboats to take on fresh water and supplies, especially after steamboat traffic boomed when gold was discovered in the Black Hills.

Dakota territorial capital
With two days left in his term, President James Buchanan signed a law on March 2, 1861, creating the Dakota Territory. Yankton was designated as the territorial capital, and newly inaugurated President Abraham Lincoln appointed his personal physician, William A. Jayne of Springfield, Illinois, as the first territorial governor.  The territorial capitol building, a plain, two-story wooden structure, was located at the intersection of Fourth and Capitol Streets; the original structure has been demolished, but a replica of the building has been constructed in Yankton's Riverside Park. Yankton served as the territorial capital until 1883 when the capital was moved to Bismarck (now the capital of North Dakota).

Yankton Stockade
In response to the Dakota War of 1862 in western Minnesota, Governor Jayne issued a proclamation on August 30, 1862, requiring every male between the ages of 18 and 50 in every settlement in eastern Dakota, be formed into militias to protect against expected attacks from the Native Americans. In response, the Yankton militia built a stockade at the corner of Third Street and Broadway Avenue of approximately 200,000 square feet.  Settlers from the surrounding area, and as far away as Sioux Falls and Bon Homme County, fled to Yankton to seek shelter in the structure.

Although roving bands of Native Americans did approach Yankton over the course of several weeks, no attack ensued, and the stockade was eventually abandoned and torn down. There is a historical marker at the site of the former stockade.

Among the most notable events that occurred in Yankton while capital, Jack McCall, murderer of Wild Bill Hickok in Deadwood on August 2, 1876, was tried in Yankton for Hickok's murder, found guilty, and was hanged on March 1, 1877, at the age of 24. His body is buried in a Yankton cemetery.

Yankton College
Due to the urging of the Reverend Joseph Ward of Yankton, the General Association of Congregational Churches in Dakota Territory voted in May 1881 to establish "Pilgrim College" in Yankton, which was to be the first private institution of higher learning in Dakota. When the college was incorporated in August 1881, the name had been changed to "Yankton College".  Classes commenced in October 1882, and Yankton College played a prominent role in the city for over 100 years.

Then, in 1983, the small liberal arts college was forced to close due to financial insolvency.  After remaining vacant for several years, the historic campus, which is listed on the National Register of Historic Places, was purchased by the United States Federal Bureau of Prisons for use as a minimum security prison. The Federal Prison Camp – Yankton houses approx 850 male inmates.

River Port and the Flood of 1881

Since its founding, Yankton enjoyed a natural advantage as a steamboat landing along the Missouri River due to the fact that its landing stretched along the entire length of the town's riverfront. The first steamboat to reach Yankton from St.  Louis arrived in 1859, providing goods and supplies to settlers and fur-traders in upper and central Dakota. Since then, the city continued to grow and quickly became the second largest city in South Dakota.  The railroad reached Yankton in 1872. In 1874, gold was discovered in the Black Hills and prospectors rushed into Dakota Territory. By 1880, Yankton had become an established riverboat port on the Missouri River. It retained its position as the second largest city in South Dakota until the beginning of the 20th century.

The city's status as an important port was literally crushed on March 27, 1881, when an ice dam on the Missouri River burst, sending flood waters and giant blocks of ice flowing towards the town.

The resulting flood waters continued to accumulate behind the debris, and by March 29, the town's riverfront and downtown were covered in water, ice and rock, destroying or stranding several riverboats that were moored there. As a result of this flood, and the expansion of railroads as a preferred method of shipping goods, Yankton's river boat traffic was reduced, and the city's role as a prominent stopping point on the way west dwindled over the next several years.

Francis Marion Ziebach established the second newspaper in the area that became South Dakota, the Weekly Dakotan, in Yankton on June 6, 1861, bringing his outfit from Sioux Falls by team and wagon. A second newspaper, started by Francis Marion Ziebach, is still published today as the Yankton Press and Dakotan.

In 1882, the Human Services Center was established as a psychiatric hospital. On June 2, 1883, Dakota Territory Governor Nehemiah G. Ordway moved the territorial capital from Yankton to Bismarck, present-day North Dakota.

National Register of Historic Places

As evidence of its rich historical past, Yankton has 26 individual properties and 6 historic districts within the city listed on the National Register of Historic Places, maintained by the U.S. National Park Service.  Each individual district contains several structures, and include:
 the Yankton (residential) Historic District,
 the Yankton College Historic District,
 the Yankton High School Historic District,
 the Yankton Historic Commercial District
 the House of Gurney Historic District, and
 the South Dakota Human Services Center campus.

Government
Yankton is governed by the City Commission, under a Council-Manager form of Local Government. The City Commission is responsible for legislative functions such as establishing policy, passing local ordinances, and voting appropriations. The City Commission appoints the City Manager to oversee the administrative operations, implement its policies, and advise the commission. The manager position is similar to that of corporate chief executive officer (CEO), providing professional management to the board of directors. There are nine Commissioners that are elected by the citizens, and the Mayor is elected by the commission. As of 2018 the current Mayor is Nathan Johnson.

The Yankton Police Department provides law enforcement for the city's residents. In 2006 it employed 29 sworn personnel.

Education

Yankton is served by the Yankton Public School District (K-12), Sacred Heart Catholic School (pK-8), and Mount Marty College.

Yankton was once home to Yankton College; founded in 1881, it was the first liberal arts college in the Dakota Territory. The college closed in 1984.  The campus was acquired by the Federal Bureau of Prisons in 1988 for use as the Federal Prison Camp – Yankton.

The Yankton School District has a variety of extracurricular activities including athletics and non-athletics. The athletic teams are universal on all levels of education including the Yankton Middle School and the Yankton High School. The boys' athletic teams are known as the Yankton Bucks and the girls' teams are known as the Yankton Gazelles. Yankton's debate team is the host of the annual Lewis and Clark Debate Tournament, held on the last weekend of the month of January.

Yankton is home to Mount Marty University, a private Benedictine Catholic institution of higher learning.  Mounty Marty College Academy was founded in 1922 and subsequently changed their name to Mount Marty College in 1951 when they became a four-year, baccalaureate degree granting institution.  The most recent change was the addition of doctoral programs and a transition to Mount Marty University in 2020.  Mount Marty University athletes are known as the Lancers and compete in the National Association of Intercollegiate Athletics.

Recreation

The City of Yankton maintains fourteen municipal parks, including Fantle Memorial Park, which is the location of an outdoor public swimming pool, and Riverside Park, which is home to the city's Riverside Baseball Field. There are two golf courses in the city:  the Fox Run municipal golf course, and the private golf course located at Hillcrest Golf and Country Club. The City of Yankton and the Yankton School District jointly maintain and operate the Yankton High School and Summit Activities Center; this facility offers an indoor swimming pool, several gymnasiums, and a public weight lifting room.

The double-decker Meridian Bridge over the Missouri River was decommissioned for traffic in October 2008 after the new Discovery Highway Bridge was opened.  This old bridge was converted to a pedestrian bridge (photo), and is part of the city's extensive pedestrian and bicycle path system. The Brokaw-Auld Trail is a linear park and recreational path along Marne Creek, and the State of South Dakota has developed trails and paths to and throughout the Lewis and Clark Recreation Area.

Four miles west of Yankton, Lewis and Clark Lake attracts over 1.5 million visitors per year. The Lewis and Clark State Recreation Area, extending approximately two miles along the north shore of Lewis and Clark Lake, offering camping, swimming, hiking/biking trails, and boating facilities. The Lewis and Clark Resort and Marina is located within the park and offers cabin rentals, marina slips, convenience store, and a waterfront restaurant. The U.S. Army Corps of Engineers also maintains public recreation areas along the Missouri River just downstream of Gavins Point Dam.

Transportation

Air transportation is provided by the Chan Gurney Municipal Airport, owned by the City of Yankton; however, the nearest airports with commercial flights are Sioux Falls Regional Airport in Sioux Falls and Sioux Gateway Airport in Sioux City, Iowa.

U.S. Route 81 serves the city as a north–south highway that connects the city with Nebraska across the Missouri River to the south via the Discovery Bridge, which replaced the Historic Meridian Highway Bridge in 2008. Interstate 90 is approximately 65 miles north of the city, and Interstate 80 is about 160 miles south of the city, via U.S. Route 81. U.S. Route 81 is also signed as Broadway Avenue within city limits.

South Dakota Highway 50 serves the city as an east–west highway and includes a four-lane divided highway that connects the city to Interstate 29, approximately 33 miles to the east.

South Dakota Highway 52 connects the city to the Lewis and Clark Lake area, about four miles to the west.

Media
Broadcasting in Yankton began in 1922 when WNAX radio went on the air.  Today, two AM radio stations and two commercial FM stations are licensed to Yankton:

Radio

AM radio

FM radio

Several low-power non-commercial FM stations are licensed to Yankton.

There are no commercial television stations based in Yankton.  Stations from Sioux Falls and Sioux City serve Yankton. One Sioux Falls station, KTTW (digital channel 7), is rebroadcast on analog channel 21 in Yankton.

KUSD-TV, the flagship station of South Dakota Public Broadcasting, is based in nearby Vermillion.

Yankton is also home to South Dakota Magazine, a statewide bi-monthly publication that explores the history, culture, arts, travel and outdoors of the state. It is published in a historic building constructed in 1875 by Territorial Governor John Pennington.

Culture
Mount Marty University offers several cultural assets and venues in Yankton, including the Bede Art Gallery, which showcases artwork from regional and Native American artists, as well as Marian Auditorium, which hosts performing and fine art events.  The college is also home to Great Plains Writers' Tour, which brings award-winning professional writers to campus for readings and class workshops.  Previous authors include former United States poet laureate Ted Kooser, American Book Award winner Maria Mazziotti Gillan, Elizabeth Cook-Lynn, David Lee, and William Kloefkorn, among others.

Yankton is also home to the Dakota Territorial Museum, which is housed in the newly restored Mead Cultural Education Building on the campus of the Human Services Center in north Yankton.  The collection contains information and artifacts about the heritage and development of the City of Yankton and the surrounding area.  The museum's collection includes artifacts of Dakota Territory, Native American inhabitants, and early pioneers. The museum complex also contains several outbuildings, such as a restored rural school house and the Great Northern Railway Depot which will be moved to the new location at 82 Mickelson Drive in the latter part of 2019.  The museum also displays a retired Burlington Northern Railway caboose.

Yankton's Riverboat Days is an annual celebration held in the third full weekend in August. The primarily free event attracts 135,000 people and hosts over 150 artists and over 50 food vendors at Riverside Park. Other activities include a rodeo, parade, golf tournament, and snowmobile grass drag race.

Sports
The National Field Archery Association, NFAA, moved its headquarters from Redland, California to Yankton, South Dakota.

Special sporting events
The National Field Archery Association's Easton Yankton Archery Complex hosted nearly 600 archers from 51 countries for the 2015 World Archery Youth Championships.

Contemporary culture

Games
Yankton is a Native American settlement featured in the video game Empire: Total War.
One of the fictional U.S. states featured in the 2013 Rockstar Games title Grand Theft Auto V is called North Yankton, named after both the city and county. However, the real U.S. state it's based on is North Dakota, as opposed to Yankton's actual home of South Dakota.

Television
Yankton is mentioned numerous times as the territorial capital in the western TV series Deadwood.
Yankton is mentioned in The Middle episode, "Hecks on a Train" (2015).

Notable people
 Chief Pa-le-ne-a-pa-pe ("Struck by the Ree" or "Strikes the Ree"), Yankton Sioux (Western Dakota) Tribe, signatory of Yankton Treaty of 1858 opening up eastern South Dakota for U.S. expansion
 William A. Jayne, born in Springfield, Illinois, first governor of Dakota Territory, 1861–1863; territorial delegate to the U.S. House of Representatives, 1863–1864.
 The Reverend Joseph Ward, born in Perry Center, New York, educator and founder of Yankton College; his statue is in Statuary Hall in the U.S. Capitol.
 General William H. H. Beadle, born in Parke County, Indiana, Surveyor General of Dakota Territory and educator; his statue is in Statuary Hall in the U.S. Capitol.
 John Chandler "Chan" Gurney, served as United States Senator from South Dakota between 1939 and 1951
 Lyle Alzado, NFL player, played college football at Yankton College
 Tom Brokaw, former NBC anchorman and native of Pickstown, South Dakota, graduated from Yankton High School
 Wynn Speece, WNAX radio personality (Neighbor Lady)
 Adam Vinatieri, NFL placekicker and free agent, was born in Yankton
 Stephanie Winslow, singer
 Robert H. Warren, fourth superintendent of the United States Air Force Academy
 Lawrence Welk, bandleader and native of Strasburg, North Dakota, resided in Yankton while he served as the WNAX AM radio bandleader
 Colton Iverson, basketball player, Colorado State University, NBA Boston Celtics second-round draft pick, 2013
 Layne Somsen, baseball pitcher, South Dakota State University, MLB Cincinnati Reds 22nd round draft pick, 2013
 Ralph A. Gamble, former US Congressman
 Maury Nipp, NFL player
 Abner S. Flagg, Wisconsin State Assemblyman
 Dave Koehler, Illinois State Senator
 Grant Marsh, record-setting steamboat captain.  His statue is in Riverside Park in Yankton.

See also
 Federal Prison Camp, Yankton
 Gavins Point Dam
 Human Services Center
 Lewis and Clark Lake
 Missouri National Recreational River
 Mount Marty College
 National Register of Historic Places listings in Yankton County, South Dakota
 Yankton College

References

External links

 City of Yankton – Official City Government Website
 Visit Yankton, South Dakota – Yankton Convention and Visitors Bureau
 Yankton Area Chamber of Commerce 
 Riverboat Days and Summer Arts Festival, annual festival every 3rd weekend in August.
  Missouri National Recreational River – U.S. National Park Service
 Yankton Press & Dakotan – local newspaper
 South Dakota Magazine – state magazine
 WNAX AM radio
 Gavins Point Dam / Lewis and Clark Lake – U.S. Army Corps of Engineers
 Lewis and Clark Recreation Area – South Dakota Department of Game, Fish and Parks

 
Cities in South Dakota
Former colonial and territorial capitals in the United States
Cities in Yankton County, South Dakota
County seats in South Dakota
Micropolitan areas of South Dakota
South Dakota populated places on the Missouri River
Populated places established in 1869
1869 establishments in Dakota Territory
Forts along the Missouri River